William H. Brown (1836 – November 5, 1896) was a United States Navy sailor during the American Civil War and a recipient of America's highest military decoration—the Medal of Honor.

Biography
Brown was born in 1836 in Baltimore, Maryland, and joined the Navy from his birth state on March 23, 1864.

On August 5, 1864, during the Battle of Mobile Bay, Admiral Farragut led a squadron of eighteen Union ships, including the Brooklyn, into the Confederate-held Mobile Bay. As the squadron came under fire from Fort Morgan, Fort Gaines, and four Confederate ships, Brown served the Brooklyn's shell whip, a device which lifted boxes of gunpowder from below decks up to the gun deck. He continued in his duties keeping the guns supplied with powder throughout the battle, despite intense hostile fire. The squadron successfully forced the surrender of the Confederate ships, and land forces soon captured the defending forts. Four months later, on December 31, 1864, Brown was awarded the Medal of Honor for his actions during the battle. 

Brown died at age 59 or 60 and was buried in Arlington National Cemetery, Arlington County, Virginia.

Medal of Honor citation
Landsman Brown's official Medal of Honor citation reads:

On board the U.S.S. Brooklyn during successful attacks against Fort Morgan rebel gunboats and the ram  in Mobile Bay on 5 August 1864. Stationed in the immediate vicinity of the shell whips which were twice cleared of men by bursting shells, Brown remained steadfast at his post and performed his duties in the powder division throughout the furious action which resulted in the surrender of the prize rebel ram Tennessee and in the damaging and destruction of batteries at Fort Morgan.

See also

List of American Civil War Medal of Honor recipients: A–F

Notes

References

1836 births
1896 deaths
African Americans in the American Civil War
Burials at Arlington National Cemetery
United States Navy Medal of Honor recipients
Union Navy sailors
Military personnel from Baltimore
American Civil War recipients of the Medal of Honor
People included in New York Society's Four Hundred
African-American United States Navy personnel